Isabella of Hainault (5 April 1170 – 15 March 1190) (Also spelled: Ysabella de Hainault, Ysabelle de Hainaut or Ysabeau de Hainaut) was a Queen of France as the first wife of King Philip II. She was also formally ruling Countess of Artois de jure between 1180 and 1190.

Early life 
Isabella was born in Valenciennes on 5 April 1170, the daughter of Baldwin V, Count of Hainaut, and Margaret I, Countess of Flanders. When she was just one year old, her father had her betrothed to Henry, the future Count of Champagne. He was the nephew of Adèle of Champagne, the queen of France. In 1179, both their fathers swore that they would proceed with the marriage, but her father later agreed to her marrying King Philip II.

Queen of France 
Isabella married Philip on 28 April 1180 at Bapaume, and brought as her dowry the county of Artois. The marriage was arranged by her maternal uncle Philip, Count of Flanders, who was advisor to the King. The wedding did not please the queen dowager, for it meant the rejection of her nephew and the lessening of her brothers' influence.

She was crowned Queen of France at Saint Denis on 28 May 1180. As Baldwin V rightly claimed his daughter to be a descendant of Charlemagne, the chroniclers of the time saw in this marriage a union of the Carolingian and Capetian dynasties.

Though Isabella received extravagant praise from certain annalists, she initially failed to win Philip's affections owing to her inability to provide him with an heir, although she was only 14 years old at the time. Meanwhile, in 1184, Philip was waging war against Flanders; angered at seeing his wife's father Baldwin support his enemies, he called a council at Sens for the purpose of repudiating her. According to Gislebert of Mons, Isabella then appeared barefooted and dressed as a penitent in the town's churches, thus gaining the sympathy of the people. Her appeals angered them so much that they went to the palace and started shouting loud enough to be heard inside. Robert, the king's uncle, successfully interposed; no repudiation followed, for repudiating her would also have meant the loss of Artois. 

Finally, on 5 September 1187, she gave birth to the desired son, Louis.

Death
Isabella's second pregnancy was extremely difficult. On 14 March 1190, she gave birth to twin boys named Robert (who died the same day) and Philip (who died 3 days afterwards, on 17 March). Owing to complications in childbirth, she died in Paris the next day (15 March), aged not quite 20, and was buried in the cathedral of Notre-Dame. She was mourned greatly in the capital, having been a popular queen. Her husband was not with her when she died, nor did he attend the funeral, as he was away in Normandy campaigning against Richard I of England. When Philip learnt of her death, he hastily signed a truce with Richard and returned to Paris, where he confirmed the placement of her tomb and spent several days in mourning before returning to Normandy the following week. In a letter to Pope Clement III, he wrote that he greatly missed his late wife. 

Isabella's son Louis succeeded her as Count of Artois. Her dowry of Artois eventually returned to the French crown following the death of her husband, when her son Louis became king.

Appearance
"Queen Isabelle, she of noble form and lovely eyes." In 1858, Isabelle's body was exhumed and measured at the cathedral of Notre Dame in Paris. At 90 cm from pelvis to feet, she would have stood about 1.72-1.75 m, (5'8"-5'9") tall. It was during this exhumation that a silver seal (now in the British Museum) was discovered in the queen's coffin. Little used during her lifetime, it is one of the few medieval seals with a royal connection to survive from the Middle Ages.

References

Sources

Attribution

1170 births
1190 deaths
People from Valenciennes
House of Hainaut
Deaths in childbirth
French queens consort
House of Capet
Isabella
French people of German descent
12th-century women rulers
12th-century French people
12th-century French women
Burials at Notre-Dame de Paris
Wives of Philip II of France